The men's light heavyweight (81 kg/178.2 lbs) Thai-Boxing division at the W.A.K.O. European Championships 2006 in Skopje was the fourth heaviest of the male Thai-Boxing tournaments involving twelve fighters.  Each of the matches was three rounds of two minutes each and were fought under Thai-Boxing rules.

As there were not enough fighters for a tournament of sixteen, four of the men automatically went into the quarter final stage.  The tournament champion was Dzianis Hancharonak of Belarus who won gold by beating Ivan Damianov of Bulgaria in the final by walkover.  Dmytro Kirpan of the Ukraine and Arpad Forgon of Hungary were awarded bronze medals.

Results

Key

See also
List of WAKO Amateur European Championships
List of WAKO Amateur World Championships
List of male kickboxers

References

External links
 WAKO World Association of Kickboxing Organizations Official Site

W.A.K.O. European Championships 2006 (Skopje)